The 2003 Georgia Southern Eagles football team represented the Georgia Southern Eagles of Georgia Southern University during the 2003 NCAA Division I-AA football season. The Eagles played their home games at Paulson Stadium in Statesboro, Georgia. The team was coached by Mike Sewak, in his second year as head coach for the Eagles.

Schedule

References

Georgia Southern
Georgia Southern Eagles football seasons
Southern Conference football champion seasons
Georgia Southern Eagles football